Green Township is one of the fifteen townships of Gallia County, Ohio, United States. As of the 2010 census the population was 5,625.

Geography
Located at the center of the county, it borders the following townships:
Springfield Township - north
Addison Township - northeast corner
Gallipolis Township - east
Clay Township - southeast
Harrison Township - south
Walnut Township - southwest corner
Perry Township - west
Raccoon Township - northwest corner

Green Township is one of only two county townships without a border on another county.

No municipalities are located in Green Township.

Name and history
It is one of sixteen Green Townships statewide.

Government
The township is governed by a three-member board of trustees, who are elected in November of odd-numbered years to a four-year term beginning on the following January 1. Two are elected in the year after the presidential election and one is elected in the year before it. There is also an elected township fiscal officer, who serves a four-year term beginning on April 1 of the year after the election, which is held in November of the year before the presidential election. Vacancies in the fiscal officership or on the board of trustees are filled by the remaining trustees.

References

External links
County website

Townships in Gallia County, Ohio
Townships in Ohio